Bow Lake may refer to:

In the United States:
Bow Lake (New Hampshire)
Bow Lake Village, New Hampshire, at the outlet of Bow Lake

In Canada:
Bow Lake (Alberta) in Banff National Park
Bow Lake, (Ontario), a lake in Hastings County